OUZ may refer to:

 Ohio University – Zanesville, a branch campus of Ohio University
 IATA Airport Code for Tazadit Airport in Mauritania